Khindakh is a rural locality (a selo) and the administrative center of Khindakhsky Selsoviet, Tlyaratinsky District, Republic of Dagestan, Russia. The population was 164 as of 2010.

Geography 
Khindakh is located 32 km north of Tlyarata (the district's administrative centre) by road. Albaniya is the nearest rural locality.

References 

Rural localities in Tlyaratinsky District